Mikelangelo Loconte (5 December 1973) is an Italian singer, author, composer, musician, performer and artistic director. He was born in Cerignola, but began his acting and performing career in France, in the musical Les Nouveaux Nomades by Claude Barzotti and Anne-Marie Gaspard. Without speaking French, he recorded all his songs in a studio using phonetic writing in the early years of his career.

Career
Discovered in Belgium by Alec Mansion (member of Léopold Nord & Vous band), Loconte worked as an artistic director in the studio La Chapelle in Waimes.

He reached star status portraying Wolfgang Amadeus Mozart in the musical Mozart, l'opéra rock, directed by Dove Attia and Albert Cohen. His first single, "Tatoue-moi", was a number-one hit in France in 2009. Later, Mozart, l'opéra rock has witnessed a growing international fan base and went on a tour to Korea in 2016 and then other tours to Shanghai and Taiwan in 2018, in which Loconte portrays Wolfgang Amadeus Mozart.

Mikelangelo Loconte is a new ambassador of the Organisation for the Prevention of Blindness (OPC).

References

External links
  Official site
 Organisation for the Prevention of Blindness

1973 births
French-language singers of Italy
People from Cerignola
Italian pop singers
Living people
Italian expatriates in Belgium
21st-century Italian  male singers